A railtour is a special train which is run in order to allow people to experience rail travel which is not normally available using timetabled passenger services. The 'unusual' aspect may be the route of the train, the destination, the occasion, specific sections of railway track (for example, freight-only lines), the locomotive hauling the train, the rolling stock (passenger carriages), or any combination of these. Organisers may own or hire locomotives or rolling stock, or tours may be organised by railway management or other bodies outside the railway fraternity. Perhaps the most famous railtour in England was the Fifteen Guinea Special, the last steam hauled main line train run by British Rail. Railtours are often identifiable through the use of a train headboard, often identifying the name of the specific tour or the tour operator. On TOPS, railtours are always given a 1Zxx headcode.

Types of Railtour

Destination tours
A 'destination' railtour is often associated with a special event of railway significance. Open days or special events at heritage railway locations such as Barrow Hill Engine Shed and the West Somerset Railway have been destinations for railtours originating from large cities. Similarly, organisations such as the Crusader Union may hire a train to take a large number of people to a specific event.

Locomotive tours
A 'locomotive' railtour focuses on the type of locomotive hauling the train. This may be a preserved locomotive, a type not usually used for passenger trains, or a type of locomotive which normally works some distance from the chosen route. Railtours in the 1980s saw a Class 52 running to York and a Class 55 to Exeter.

Nostalgic tours
One type of railtour which is currently popular is the nostalgic excursion using a preserved train, or sometimes a train hired from a railway operator. Preserved steam locomotives are popular performers on UK railtours, sometimes covering 400 miles in one day at speeds of over 75 miles per hour. Train, branding and route are often chosen as to reflect a common theme, sometimes tracing an aspect of railway history. Railtours are organised both on a commercial basis and as a fund-raising method for railway preservation societies.

Track or route tours
A track or route railtour is focused on travelling over sections of railway track that are not used by scheduled passenger trains. Locations – such as Carne Point at Fowey, Cornwall – which have not seen passenger trains for several decades, or locations that have never had a public passenger service – such as the MOD depot at Long Marston – can be traversed by such trains.

Compass Tours
DPS Railtours
Pathfinder Tours
SRPS_Railtours
Steam Dreams (operator of the Cathedrals Express railtours) 
Torbay Express Limited (operates on Sundays from July to September; between Bristol Temple Meads and Paignton/Kingswear).
Venice-Simplon Orient Express
Vintage Trains
West Coast Railways (operator of The Jacobite railtours from Fort William to Mallaig, which runs on every weekday throughout the summer months, and the Scarborough Spa Express)

Current Railtour operators in Ireland 

Enthusiast Railtours
Irish Railway Record Society
Modern Railway Society of Ireland
Táilte Tours
Railway Preservation Society of Ireland

Luxury Railtours
Steam Dreams (Emerald Isle Explorer)
Railtours Ireland (Emerald Isle Express)

Former Railtour operators
Southern Railtours
ITG Railtours Ltd
Ian Walsh
Westrail
Belmond Grand Hibernian (Starting August 2016)

See also
 Mainline steam trains in Great Britain
 Railway enthusiast

References

Passenger rail transport